The Home Girl is a 1928 silent short film directed by Edmund Lawrence and starring Margalo Gillmore, Otto Kruger and Miriam Hopkins. It was made by Paramount as part of their 'Great Stars and Authors' series, with The Home Girl being the 4th installment. It is based on a story by Edna Ferber. Miriam Hopkins was a well known Broadway actress at this time and she later signed a long term and successful contract with Paramount after the advent of talking pictures.

Cast
Margalo Gillmore
Otto Kruger
Miriam Hopkins
Sylvia Field
Vincent Lopez - Orchestra leader

Preservation
A copy is preserved at UCLA Film & Television archive.

References

External links
The Home Girl IMDb.com
 lobby poster with Otto Kruger and Miriam Hopkins

1928 films 
Silent short films